Beauchard is a surname. Notable people with the surname include:

David Beauchard (born 1959), French comic book artist and writer
Dominique Beauchard, character in American Empire (film)
Karine Beauchard (born 1978), French mathematician